Department of Media and Communications is the name of several university departments, including:

 Department of Media and Communication (RUPP), at the Royal University of Phnom Penh

See also
 List of ministries of communications, for government departments
 Lists of universities and colleges